Oakham Ales is an English brewery now based in Peterborough, Cambridgeshire, but first established in Oakham, Rutland.  The original owner, John Wood, left Oakham Ales in 1995.

Its headquarters is the largest brewpub in Europe, The Brewery Tap, which opened in 1998 and is located in the old labour exchange in Westgate, Peterborough. The brewery also owns The Bartons Arms in Aston, Birmingham.

Among awards the beers won have been JHB 3.8% picking up the Supreme Champion Beer Award in 2001 and Attila 7.4% was the National Winter Beers Champion for 2009.

Notes

External links
 Official website

Breweries in England
Companies based in Peterborough
Oakham